The 1919–20 Yale Bulldogs men's ice hockey season was the 25th season of play for the program.

Season
Yale appointed former Cornell bench boss Talbot Hunter as head coach, the first for the team since 1917. Owing to not having a home rink for the season, Yale began with a series of road games mostly against Canadian colleges during the winter break.

The delay in completion of the Philadelphia Ice Palace forced the Elis to play only one further game before February. Once the Ice Palace was ready Yale managed to finish out their slate of conference games for the first season of the Triangular Hockey League. They were able to defeat Princeton twice but fell to Harvard in both matches, finishing second in the Triangular League.

Yale played seven of their nine games under the 6-on-6 with three periods format with only the first Princeton and second Harvard game being played at their more usual 7-on-7 with two halves.

Roster

Standings

Schedule and Results

|-
!colspan=12 style="color:white; background:#00356B" | Regular Season

References

Yale Bulldogs men's ice hockey seasons
Yale
Yale
Yale
Yale